Don't Look Back is an album by jazz cornetist Nat Adderley recorded in 1976 and released on the Danish SteepleChase label and on Inner City Records in the US.

Reception

The Penguin Guide to Jazz states "Adderley's reputation as a mainstream traditionalist takes a knock with sets like these. Unfortunately the results aren't by any means commensurate with the daring of the lineup. ... A bold effort but not quite there".

Track listing 
 "Funny Funny" (Nat Adderley) – 6:10
 "K. High" (Ira Buddy Williams) – 9:31
 "Just a Quickie" (Fernando Gumbs) – 4:50
 "I Think I Got It" (Onaje Allan Gumbs) – 6:58
 "Home" (Ken McIntyre) – 6:30
 "Don't Look Back" (Harold Vick) – 7:30
 "Home" [take 1] (McIntyre) – 6:54 Bonus track on CD release

Personnel 
Nat Adderley – cornet
John Stubblefield – tenor saxophone, soprano saxophone
Ken McIntyre – alto saxophone, bass clarinet, flute, oboe
Onaje Allan Gumbs – piano, electric piano, clavinet
Fernando Gumbs – bass
Ira Buddy Williams – drums
Victor See Yuen – congas, percussion

References 

1976 albums
SteepleChase Records albums
Nat Adderley albums